Nusura Tiperu Omar is a Ugandan diplomat,politician and former legislator. She currently serves as the ambassador of Uganda to Turkey. She was appointed to that position in December 2021. 

Before that, between 2007 and 2017, she served two consecutive terms as one of the nine members representing Uganda in the 2nd and 3rd East African Legislative Assembly (EALA) in Arusha, Tanzania. She was elected to serve in that capacity in June 2012, for the next five years. She also served in the same capacity from June 2007 until June 2012, during the 2nd EALA Session.

Background and education
She was born in Yumbe District, West Nile sub-region, in Northern Uganda on 21 October 1974. Nusura Tiperu attended Mukono Town Academy in Mukono District for her A-Level studies, from 1992 until 1993. She then entered Makerere University, Uganda's oldest university, where she studied Social Sciences from 1994 until 1997. She graduated with the degree of Bachelor of Arts in Social Sciences.

Career
From 1996 until 2001, she served as the Female Youth Member of Parliament, representing all young women in Uganda. She was then elected to serve as the Woman Member of Parliament, representing Yumbe District in Parliament from 2001 until 2006. From 2007 until 2012, she served in the East African Legislative Assembly in Arusha, Tanzania, representing the Republic of Uganda. In June 2012, she was re-elected to serve in the same capacity for another five-year term.

Other responsibilities
She is the Chairperson of the International Muslim Women’s Union. She is also a member of the Central Executive Committee of the National Resistance Movement, the ruling political party in Uganda since 1986. Nusura Tiperu Omar is married. She is reported to be fluent in the following languages: English, Swahili, Alur, Aringa and Luganda. From 2012 until 2015, she served as  member of the EALA Commission. The Commission "manages the affairs of the Assembly, organizes the business and program of the House, and nominates members of other committees".

See also
 East African Community
 Parliament of Uganda
 Margaret Zziwa
 Daniel Kidega

References

External links
 Members of 3rd East African Legislative Assembly

Living people
1974 births
Alur people
Ugandan Muslims
Makerere University alumni
People from West Nile sub-region
21st-century Ugandan women politicians
21st-century Ugandan politicians
20th-century Ugandan women politicians
20th-century Ugandan politicians
Members of the Parliament of Uganda
Women members of the Parliament of Uganda
Members of the East African Legislative Assembly
People from Yumbe District
People from Northern Region, Uganda
Turkey–Uganda relations
Ambassadors of Uganda to Turkey